The New Castle Presbytery is the parent organization of the 47 churches and 2 new worshipping communities, 108 ministers, and 6,900 members of the Presbyterian Church (USA), Synod of Mid-Atlantic covering Delaware and the Maryland Eastern Shore. The Presbytery was formed in 1717 after the division of the Presbytery of Philadelphia into three presbyteries, which were subordinate to the newly formed Synod of Philadelphia.

References

External links
New Castle Presbytery Website, Retrieved October 15, 2005.

Presbyterianism in Delaware
Presbyterianism in Maryland
Presbyterian Church (USA) presbyteries
1717 establishments in Maryland